Abd-ol Seyyed (also Romanized as ‘Abd-ol Seyyed; also known as ‘Abd-e Sa‘īd, ‘Abd ol Sa‘īd-e Marīvash) is a village in Shoaybiyeh-ye Gharbi Rural District, Shadravan District, Shushtar County, Khuzestan Province, Iran. At the 2006 census, its population was 643, with 107 families.

References 

Populated places in Shushtar County